Zainol Gulam is a Singaporean footballer who plays as a goalkeeper for Singapore Premier League club Hougang United.

Club career

Warriors FC 
Zainol was part of Warriors FC's squad in 2016 and came on as a substitute after fellow custodian Yazid Yasin was sent off during a match against Tampines Rovers. Zainol was handed a start against Brunei DPMM for the following match and displayed a great performance as he held his opponents to a 1-1 draw.

At the end of the 2017 season, Zainol was released from the club and contemplated retirement to sign on in the civil force.

Geylang International

2018 season 
Geylang International came knocking on Zainol's door and signed him on for the 2018 season behind Jasper Chan. After Chan suffered an injury within his first few games. Zainol was given the nod in goal and stared in Geylang's 17 league matches. 

During a league match against former club Warriors in the National Stadium, Zainol made a string of saves to keep his former side at bay in a 2-0 victory, nicking him as the King of Kallang.

2019 season 
In the 2019 Singapore Cup 3rd place play-offs against Brunei DPMM, Zainol made the winning save in the penalty shootout to help the Eagles clinch third place.

2020 season 
During a league match against Lion City Sailors on 18 October 2020, Zainol was sent off after performing a reckless tackle on Arshad Shamim, conceding a penalty at the same time which back-up goalkeeper Hairul Syirhan could not keep out.

Zainol, along with Geylang International, qualified for the 2021 AFC Cup ASEAN group stage which was promptly cancelled in the following season.

2021 season 
Zainol started in goal against Lion City Sailors on 11 April 2021 at Our Tampines Hub in an 8-0 defeat to the hands of the visitors.

Zainol started only 6 out of Geylang's 14 matches at the time and declared retirement from professional football on 17 August 2021 due to the logistics behind professionalism in Singapore football. Zainol citing that football wasn't a secured job for him due to contract negotiations and decided to sign on with the Singapore Civil Defence Force. Zainol was also one out of five goalkeepers Geylang deployed in their entire league campaign.

Hougang United

Return from retirement 
During the 2022 Singapore Premier League season, Zainol was found wearing Hougang United's tees in the stands over the course of the season.

On 18 June 2022, Hougang United announced that Zainol had come back from retirement and signed for the Cheetahs. He was a used substitute in their 8-0 defeat against Johor Darul Ta'zim in a friendly. Zainol made his return to the league on 15 October 2022 against the Young Lions, winning 5-3. He ended his league campaign with a clean sheet against Balestier Khalsa before being substituted on for Aizil Yazid in the 81st minute.

Zainol started in all but one game in Hougang's Singapore Cup run, helping the Cheetahs to their first ever silverware.

International career 
Zainol was called up for training by the Singapore national team in 2019 but never made a single appearance for the Lions.

Career statistics 

Update 23 May 2021

References

Living people
Singaporean footballers
Association football midfielders
Singapore Premier League players
1992 births
Geylang International FC players